This is a list of television broadcasters which provide coverage of the Copa Sudamericana, the secondary club football tournament in South America organized by CONMEBOL.

Broadcasters

2023-2026

South America

International

References 

Broadcasters
Copa Sudamericana